Annie John (born on 16 November 1957) is a former judge of Kerala High Court. The High Court of Kerala is the highest court in the Indian state of Kerala and in the Union Territory of Lakshadweep. The High Court of Kerala is headquartered at Ernakulam, Kochi.

Early life
She was born to Adv. John Madathil and Smt. Mariakutty John. Completed her schooling from Govt. LP School and UP School, Vaikom and St. Little Teresa's Convent School, Vaikom, graduated from Bharata Mata College, Thrikkakkara and obtained a law degree from Mahadeva Salgogar College of Law, Panaji, Goa.

Career
She enrolled in Bar Council of Kerala in 1982 and started practicing as an advocate with her father Adv. John Madathil. On 16 January 1989 she joined Kerala Civil Judicial Service and served as Munsiff at North Paravur and Ernakulam, as  Judicial First Class Magistrate, Perumbavoor, as Principal Munsiff, Irinjalakuda, as Sub Judge, Cherthala, as Chief Judicial Magistrate, Palakkad, as District Judge, Thalassery, as Judge, Motor Accident Claims Tribunal, Perumbavoor, as Judge, Family Court, Thodupuzha, as District Judge, Thodupuzha, as District Judge, Alappuzha and Principal District & Sessions Judge, Thrissur. On 30 November 2017 she was appointed as additional judge of Kerala High Court and became permanent from 29 August 2019. She demitted office upon attainment of superannuation on 15 November 2019.

References

External links
 High Court of Kerala

Living people
Judges of the Kerala High Court
21st-century Indian judges
1957 births